The rusty-headed spinetail (Synallaxis fuscorufa) is a species of bird in the family Furnariidae. It is endemic to the Sierra Nevada de Santa Marta.

Its natural habitats are subtropical or tropical moist montane forests and heavily degraded former forest. It is threatened by habitat loss.

References

External links
BirdLife Species Factsheet.

rusty-headed spinetail
Birds of the Sierra Nevada de Santa Marta
Endemic birds of Colombia
rusty-headed spinetail
rusty-headed spinetail
Taxonomy articles created by Polbot